Valery Kopytov (born 1971), known as the Barnaul Chikatilo, is a Russian serial killer who murdered 19 homeless people in Altai Krai between 2000 and 2004.

Early life
Little information is known publicly of Kopytov's early life. In 1998, 27-year-old Kopytov was released from prison after serving a sentence for mercenary crimes. After his release, he moved in with his father in Barnaul and failed to find friends or employment. Dissatisfied with his life, he left home and built a dugout beneath the New Bridge beside the Ob River.

Crimes
In 2004 or 2005, investigators discovered 13 corpses buried in the vicinity of the New Bridge. Later, they were led to Valery Kopytov, after a friend reported him to the police after he told him of his crimes. Kopytov was arrested and led investigators to an additional six bodies buried around the cities of Novoaltaysk, Zarinsk and Biysk. His victims were stabbed or beaten to death with heavy objects.

Kopytov told investigators that most of the victims were fellow homeless people that he got into quarrels with, while some others he killed to steal their belongings. Due to his cooperation with law enforcement, he avoided a life sentence, instead receiving 25 years in prison, ten to be spent in prison and 15 in a special regime colony. If he is still incarcerated, he will be released in 2030, when he will be 59 years old.

See also
 List of Russian serial killers
 List of serial killers by number of victims

References

1971 births
Living people
Male serial killers
People convicted of robbery
People from Altai Krai
Russian male criminals
Russian people convicted of murder
Russian serial killers